An Island Parish is a British television documentary made by Tiger Aspect Productions for BBC Two. Series 1 and 2 covered the lives of residents of the Church of England parish of the Isles of Scilly. These series were supported by the Diocese of Truro. They followed A Seaside Parish, which covered the work of the Reverend Christine Musser in the parish of Boscastle in Cornwall, and also A Country Parish before that. Series 3 and 4 looked particularly at the work of the Methodist Church on the Isles of Scilly, as seen through the eyes of the local minister, the Revd David Easton. Series 5 moved north and followed Fr John Paul in his first year as the Roman Catholic priest at Castlebay on the island of Barra, the second southernmost inhabited island in the Outer Hebrides (after Vatersay, to which it is linked by a causeway). Series 6 was filmed on Barra by Tiger Aspect Productions during 2011 and aired in early 2012, while series seven began in late 2012 and follows the Anglican priest and Methodist minister on Sark. Series 7 and 8 (2013 and 2014 respectively) remained on Sark, while Series 9 and 10(2015) focuses on the Falkland Islands. The eleventh series is set in The Shetland Islands, broadcast in March and April 2016. The twelfth series, broadcast from January 2017, focuses on Anguilla.

Episodes

First series
The first series, in eight parts, focused on life in the Isles of Scilly and aired in January 2007. It followed the Bishop of Truro, Bill Ind, known as "Bishop Bill"', as he searched for the right person to become the new chaplain to the islands. After much soul-searching, the Reverend Guy Scott decided to leave his parish in Mullion on the mainland in Cornwall and apply for the position. The series subsequently followed his eventual arrival on the islands with his family and the difficulties he has faced in adjusting to island life. It also followed the fortunes of islands police force Summer Attachment, PC Nikki Green, local fishermen Martin and Joel Bond and the veterinarian who left the Isles, Rik Barrowman.

Second series
Following the success of the first series the BBC commissioned a second series of twelve weekly episodes, which were first broadcast on 8 January 2008. The series looked at various aspects of island life including gig racing, employment prospects for the young, tourism and different ways for islanders to increase income, as well as the daily life of the Reverend Guy Scott and other figures on the islands, including PC Nikki Green, the award-winning baker Toby Tobin-Dougan, the Seven Stones pub's new head chef, Paulie Websdale, and the new veterinarian, Heike Dorn. The series also featured Radio Scilly and the station's first day on air, 3 September 2007.

Third series
The third series of An Island Parish began on 19 September 2008 on BBC Two. The series was again in twelve parts.

The series looked particularly at the work of the British Methodist Church in the islands, as seen through the eyes of the local minister, the Revd David Easton. Of the third series, Nigel Farrell, the director said, "We do not have any actors, or scripts, so what you see and hear is the reality of life, which can sometimes be hard in any small community. Up to now we have focused very much on the ministry of Anglican clergy, but in Cornwall especially, almost all communities have an active Methodist presence, and we felt it was time to show some of the ways in which Free church ministers are involved in the busy lives of their communities." The third series was filmed over the preceding six months before the first episode aired, with more episodes completed while the series aired. Also included in the series was the story of the Scilly Boys' Atlantic row, and the Eden Project farewell to Bishop Bill Ind, who retired in April 2008.

Fourth series
The fourth series of An Island Parish began on 19 October 2009 on BBC Two. It ran for 14 episodes.

Fifth series
In January 2011 a fifth series of An Island Parish began, this time located on Barra in the Scottish Outer Hebrides. It features Fr John Paul's first year as the parish priest at Castlebay.

Sixth series
A sixth series was filmed by Tiger Aspect during the Spring and Summer of 2011 on the islands of Barra and South Uist.

Seventh series
The seventh series, set in Sark and broadcast in 2013, ran for 6 episodes.

Eighth series
The eighth series, set again in Sark and broadcast in 2014, ran for 6 episodes.

Ninth series
The ninth series, set in the Falkland Islands and broadcast in 2015, ran for 6 episodes.

Tenth series
The tenth series, set again in the Falkland Islands and broadcast in 2015, ran for six episodes.

Eleventh Series
The eleventh Series was set in the Shetland Islands and broadcast in Spring 2016 for six episodes.

Twelfth Series
This series was broadcast in early 2017 and was set in the British Overseas Territory of Anguilla.

References

Further reading

External links
 

First and second series episode guide on My-BBC website
Second series episode guide on BBC Cornwall site
Radio Scilly website
Richard Pearce website

2007 British television series debuts
2018 British television series endings
2000s British documentary television series
2010s British documentary television series
BBC television documentaries
Television series about Christianity
Television series by Banijay
Christianity in Cornwall
Isles of Scilly
Television series by Tiger Aspect Productions
Mass media in Shetland
English-language television shows